Samurai Jack is an American animated action-adventure television series created by Genndy Tartakovsky for Cartoon Network and distributed by Warner Bros. Domestic Television Distribution. Tartakovsky conceived Samurai Jack after finishing his work on his first Cartoon Network original series, Dexter's Laboratory, which premiered in 1996. Samurai Jack was inspired by Kung Fu, the 1972 televised drama starring David Carradine, and Tartakovsky's fascination with samurai culture.

The titular character is an unnamed Japanese samurai prince who wields a mystic katana capable of cutting through virtually anything. He sets out to free his kingdom after it is taken over by an evil, shapeshifting demon lord known as Aku. The two engage in a fierce battle, but just as the prince is about to deal the final strike, Aku sends him forward in time to a dystopian future ruled by the tyrannical demon. Adopting the name "Jack" after being addressed as such by beings in this time period, he quests to travel back to his own time and defeat Aku before he can take over the world. Jack's search for a way back to his own time period transcends Aku's control, but Jack's efforts are largely in vain due to the way back to his home ending up just out of his reach.

Samurai Jack, originally airing for four seasons comprising thirteen episodes each, was broadcast from August 10, 2001, to September 25, 2004, without concluding the overarching story. The show was revived twelve years later for a darker, more mature fifth season that provides a conclusion to Jack's story; it premiered on Cartoon Network's Adult Swim as part of its Toonami programming block on March 11, 2017, and concluded with its final episode (the series finale) on May 20, 2017. Episodes were directed by Tartakovsky, often in collaboration with others.

The series has garnered critical acclaim and won eight Primetime Emmy Awards, including Outstanding Animated Program, as well as six Annie Awards and an OIAF Award.

Premise 

Samurai Jack tells the story of an unnamed young prince (voiced by Phil LaMarr) from a kingdom set in feudal Japan, whose father (voiced by Sab Shimono as an elder man and Keone Young as a young emperor) was given a magical katana from three gods — Ra, Rama, and Odin — that he could and had used to defeat and imprison the supernatural shapeshifting demon Aku (Mako, and later Greg Baldwin for Season 5). Eight years later Aku escaped, took over the land, and held the Emperor hostage, but not before the prince was sent away by his mother to travel the world and train so he could return and use the magic sword to defeat Aku. On his return, the prince-turned-samurai faced and almost defeated Aku, but before he could land a finishing blow, Aku placed a time travel curse and sent him into the distant future, anticipating that he would be able to deal with the samurai by that time.

The samurai prince arrives on Earth surrounded in dystopian retrofuturism ruled by Aku. The first people he encounters call him "Jack" as a form of slang, which he adopts as his name. His given name is never mentioned. Jack only has his kimono, geta, and sword to his avail in his adventures. Most episodes depict Jack overcoming various obstacles in his quest to travel back to his own time and defeat Aku, and his quest is prolonged occasionally by moments where either he nearly succeeds in returning to his own time, or conversely, Aku nearly succeeds in defeating Jack, only to be undermined by the unexpected.

Setting 
The retro-futuristic world is inhabited by a variety of denizens such as robots, extraterrestrials, talking animals, monsters, magical beings, and deities. Some areas may have advanced technologies like flying cars, while others resemble ancient times or industrial conditions. Moreover, Aku has brought aliens from other planets to inhabit Earth, after destroying the habitability of their home worlds. Criminals and fugitives of all kinds and/or forms are very common on his Earth. Mythological and supernatural creatures make regular appearances and coexist among the technologically-advanced inhabitants.

However, the planet has hardly been urbanized by a number of episodes that take place in uninhabited areas of the world. Those include forests, jungles, and mountains, which have remained largely untouched even as Aku began his conquest and reign over every sentient being. There are even a few communities that have not been affected by Aku's dominance, such as the Shaolin monks, who have managed to hide and maintain their numbers in a secret place that is magically shielded from Aku's seemingly omniscient vision.

Episodes

Production 

Samurai Jack was created by Genndy Tartakovsky as a follow-up to his successful series Dexter's Laboratory. Cartoon Network executive Mike Lazzo recalled Tartakovsky pitching him the series: "He said, 'Hey, remember David Carradine in Kung Fu? Wasn't that cool?' and I was like, 'Yeah, that's really cool.' That was literally the pitch." Cartoon Network billed it as a series "that is cinematic in scope and that incorporates action, humor, and intricate artistry."

The basic premise of Samurai Jack comes from Tartakovsky's childhood fascination with samurai culture and the bushido code, as well as a recurring dream where he wandered a post-apocalyptic Earth with a samurai sword and traveled the world fighting mutants with his crush. The show is meant to evoke 1970s cinematography, as well as classic Hollywood films such as Ben-Hur, Lawrence of Arabia, and Spartacus. Thematic and visual inspirations come from Frank Miller's comic book series Rōnin, including the premise of a master-less samurai warrior thrown into a dystopic future in order to battle a shapeshifting demon. Similarly, the episode "Jack and the Spartans" was specifically inspired by Miller's graphic novel 300 that retold the Battle of Thermopylae. The Japanese manga Lone Wolf and Cub and films by Akira Kurosawa were also an inspiration.

The network announced the series' launch at a press conference on February 21, 2001. Weeks leading up to the series were accompanied by a sweepstakes giveaway sponsored by AOL in which the grand prize was a trip for four to Japan. AOL subscribers were also offered sneak peeks of Samurai Jack as well as a look at samurai traditions, future toys, behind-the-scenes model sheets, and exclusive Cartoon Orbit cToons. Samurai Jack debuted on Cartoon Network on August 10, 2001, with the three-part special "The Beginning". The premiere received high praise and four award nominations, and was released as a standalone VHS and DVD on March 19, 2002. As production of the fourth season was ending, with four seasons of 13 episodes each or 52 episodes of Samurai Jack in total, Tartakovsky, and the crew moved on to other projects. The show ended with the airing of the four final episodes as a marathon on September 25, 2004.

In Canada, Samurai Jack previously aired on YTV, and currently airs on the Canadian version of Adult Swim.

In United Kingdom, Samurai Jack previously aired on Cartoon Network, and currently airs on streaming service All 4.

Conclusion and revival

Original ending 
The original series was left open-ended after the conclusion of the fourth season. Tartakovsky said, "coming close to [the end of] the fourth season, we're like, 'are we gonna finish it?' And I didn't know... The network didn't know, they were going through a lot of transitions also. So I decided, you know, I don't want to rush and finish the whole story, and so we just left it like there is no conclusion and then [the final episode is] just like another episode". Art director Scott Wills added, "We didn't have time to think about it, because we went right into Clone Wars. They even overlapped, I think. There was no time to even think about it."

Cancelled film 
A film intended to conclude the story of Samurai Jack had been in development at different times by four different studios. As early as 2002, Cartoon Network was producing a Samurai Jack live-action feature film, in association with New Line Cinema. Brett Ratner was hired as a director. Tartakovsky said in a 2006 interview that the live-action version of Samurai Jack was thankfully abandoned, and that "we will finish the story, and there will be an animated film." Fred Seibert announced in 2007 that the newly formed Frederator Films was developing a Samurai Jack movie, which was planned to be in stereoscopic 2D with a budget of 20 million dollars. Seibert said in 2009 the film was being co-produced with J. J. Abrams' Bad Robot Productions. Sony Pictures expressed its interest to make the film. Genndy Tartakovsky said in an interview with IGN the Samurai Jack movie is in pre-production: "I've been trying so hard every year, and the one amazing thing about Jack is that I did it in 2001, you know, and it still survived. There's something about it that's connected with people. And I want it, it's number 1 on my list, and now Bob Osher, the president, is like 'Hey, let's talk about Jack. Let's see what we can do.' And I go, 'You're going to do a 2D feature animated movie?' and he's like, 'Yeah. Maybe. Let's do some research and let's see.' So it's not dead for sure by any means, and it's still on the top of my list, and I'm trying as hard as I can." Tartakovsky said the loss of Mako Iwamatsu (Aku's voice actor) would also need to be addressed. The feature film project never materialized, and eventually, the series concluded with a fifth television season.

2017 revival 

Samurai Jack returned to television over twelve years after its fourth season concluded, with the first episode of its fifth season airing on Adult Swim on March 11, 2017. Produced at Cartoon Network Studios and Williams Street with Tartakovsky as executive producer, the fifth and final season features more mature elements and a cohesive narrative that concludes Jack's journey. The story takes place fifty years after Jack was cast into the future. In despair from the years of fighting Aku and from Aku's destruction of the remaining time portals, Jack—who has not aged as a side effect of the time travel—is haunted by warped visions of himself, his family, and an enigmatic, deathly warrior on horseback. Phil LaMarr reprises his role as Jack; Greg Baldwin provides the voice of Aku. Mako, who voiced Aku in the show's first four seasons, died ten years before the revival was produced; however, an archive recording of his voice is used for Aku's past self in the series finale.

Reception

Critical reception 
Samurai Jack received generally positive reviews from critics following its 2001 Cartoon Network debut. Steven Linan of the Los Angeles Times said of the 90-minute premiere movie, "One can quibble with some of the dialogue, which sounds like something you'd hear in Karate Kid 2 ('Let the sword guide you to your fate, but let your mind set free the path to your destiny'). Nonetheless, there is one highly unconventional aspect of the series which sets it apart from others--its willingness to go for extensive stretches in which there is no dialogue."

In 2004, British broadcaster Channel 4 ran a poll of the 100 greatest cartoons, in which Samurai Jack achieved the 42nd position. The show was ranked 11th by IGN for its "Top 25 Primetime Animated Series of All Time" list in 2006. In its list ranking, IGN compared the series' writing style to Tartakovsky's Star Wars: Clone Wars, stating, "episodes have little or no dialogue, relying instead on action and strong visuals to tell the stories. Entertaining for adults, yet not too violent for kids." The review went on to say that the series' "unique combination of cinematic and comic book styles appeals to all ages." IGN also ranked the show 43rd in its Top 100 Animated Series list in 2009, saying that its "simple and colorful art style lends itself well to the cinematic scope and frenetic action sequences that fill each episode." IGN'''s review also stated that the series' "unique style and humor make the most out of the animation format, producing elaborate action sequences and bizarre situations that would be impossible to do in a live action film."

On review aggregator site Rotten Tomatoes, the series as a whole has received an approval rating of 93%. The first season received an approval rating of 80% while the fourth and fifth seasons received an approval rating of 100%. The fifth season's critical consensus reads, "An increasing intensity and maturity are evident in Samurai Jack's beautifully animated, action-packed, and overall compelling fifth season."

Matt Zoller Seitz, a film critic for RogerEbert.com and television critic for Vulture, considers Samurai Jack, along with Tartakovsky's Star Wars: Clone Wars, to be a masterwork and one of the greatest American animated shows on television, mainly for its visual style.Samurai Jack would later be included in Seitz and Alan Sepinwall's 2016 book TV (The Book) as an honorable mention following the 100 greatest television series.

 Accolades 

 Other media 
 Board game 
A year after the series was concluded, a board game adaptation covering all five seasons was released, titled Samurai Jack: Back to the Past. Players work together to complete tasks to help Jack return to the past while competing to earn honor for their actions.

 Comics 

In February 2013, IDW Publishing announced a partnership with Cartoon Network to produce comics based on its properties. Samurai Jack was one of the titles announced to be published. It was further announced at WonderCon 2013 that the first issue of Samurai Jack would debut in October 2013. The first comic in the series was released on October 23, 2013. The final issue came out in May 2015. On October 25, 2016, IDW re-released all of the issues in a compilation entitled "Tales of a Wandering Warrior". Tartakovsky does not consider the comics part of the story of Jack.

Jack also appeared in multiple issues of DC Comics' anthology comic series Cartoon Network Action Pack, which ran from July 2006 to April 2012.

 Home media 
Like other previous Cartoon Network shows, Samurai Jack DVDs were released by Warner Home Video between 2002 and 2007. The DVDs include episode numbers in Roman numerals as they appear at the end of each episode but remain untitled. Season 1 was released on Netflix streaming service in 2013. Samurai Jack: The Complete Series was released on Blu-ray and Digital HD on October 17, 2017, and contains remastered versions of the first four seasons of the series, courtesy of ACMEworks Digital Film, Inc. The series is also available on HBO Max since May 27, 2020.

 Video games 
The Samurai Jack world has been seen in the video games Samurai Jack: The Amulet of Time for the Game Boy Advance in 2003 and Samurai Jack: The Shadow of Aku for the GameCube and PlayStation 2 in 2004. Three years after the series was completed, a third game, Samurai Jack: Battle Through Time, was released on August 21, 2020, for Microsoft Windows, PlayStation 4, Xbox One, Nintendo Switch, and Apple Arcade. It is the first Samurai Jack game to be available on Microsoft and Apple platforms and serves as an alternative extended scenario of the series finale.

Elements of the Samurai Jack concept were reused in other Cartoon Network video games. The MMORPG FusionFall features Jack, the Scotsman, and Demongo as non-playable characters, while Aku is a Nano. The brawler game Cartoon Network: Punch Time Explosion'' for Nintendo 3DS, Wii, PlayStation 3, and Xbox 360 features Jack and the Scotsman as playable characters while Aku is an assist character, a boss, and a playable character.

Notes

References

External links 

 
 
 

 
2000s American animated television series
2000s American science fiction television series
2000s American time travel television series
2001 American television series debuts
2004 American television series endings
2010s American adult animated television series
2010s American science fiction television series
2010s American time travel television series
2017 American television series debuts
2017 American television series endings
Adult Swim original programming
American adult animated action television series
American adult animated adventure television series
American adult animated drama television series
American adult animated fantasy television series
American adult animated science fiction television series
American animated science fantasy television series
American television series revived after cancellation
Anime-influenced Western animated television series
Annie Award winners
Cartoon Network original programming
Television series by Cartoon Network Studios
Cyberpunk television series
Dystopian animated television series
Emmy Award-winning programs
Emmy Award winners
English-language television shows
Films with screenplays by Genndy Tartakovsky
Japan in non-Japanese culture
Martial arts television series
Shows on Toonami Jetstream
Television series about shapeshifting
Television series by Rough Draft Studios
Television series by Williams Street
Television series created by Genndy Tartakovsky
Television series set in the future
Television shows adapted into comics
Television shows adapted into video games
Toonami
Television series directed by Genndy Tartakovsky